IRDS may refer to:

 Infant respiratory distress syndrome. a syndrome characterized by difficult breathing in premature infants
 International Roadmap for Devices and Systems, an international body for guiding the semiconductor industry
 Information Resource Dictionary System, a United States Federal Information Processing Standard used to capture metadata during a system life cycle.